Mont lone yay baw (also spelt mont lone yay paw) is a traditional Burmese dessert commonly associated with the Thingyan season.

The dessert dish consists of round boiled rice balls made from glutinous rice flour, filled with pieces of jaggery or palm sugar, and garnished with fresh coconut shavings.

Traditions

The communal group preparation of mont lone yay baw is a Thingyan tradition, and partakers often play pranks by stuffing some rice balls with chili peppers instead of jaggery. Donors often dole out satuditha servings of mont lone yay baw to revelers during the Thingyan season.

Similar dishes
Similar desserts in the region include Indian modak, Malaysian onde-onde, Indonesian klepon, Thai bua loi, and the Chinese tangyuan.

References

Burmese cuisine
Foods containing coconut
Burmese desserts and snacks